Wild Sketch Show is a live video album by Sketch Show. It features a mix of Sketch Show songs (nine from Audio Sponge, four from Tronika and one song that has been never released in studio form) and Yellow Magic Orchestra songs performed in the Sketch Show style (one from Paraiso, one from BGM and two from Technodelic). Sketch Show were joined by fellow YMO member Ryuichi Sakamoto (which turned Sketch Show into Human Audio Sponge), as well as two guitarists and two keyboardists. This is the only live show released under Sketch Show's name (later releases featured the same members and style, but were released under YMO).

Track listing

Personnel
Haruomi Hosono - Bass, Keyboards, Vocals
Ryuichi Sakamoto - Keyboards, Vocals
Yukihiro Takahashi - Drums, Percussion, Vocals, Keyboards
Cornelius & Hirofumi Tokutake - Guitars
Hirohisa Horie & Junko Tanaka - Keyboards

External links
 

2003 live albums
Sketch Show (band) albums
2003 video albums